Lucasius is a genus of the family Porcellionidae.  It includes the following species:
Lucasius myrmecophilus Kinahan, 1859
Lucasius pallidus (Budde-Lund, 1885)

References

Porcellionidae